Erik Torsten Ahldén (4 September 1923 – 6 July 2013) was a Swedish runner. In 1948 he ranked second in the world over 3000–5000 m distances and placed fourth in the 5000 m event at the 1948 Olympics. He won national titles in the 5000 m in 1948 and in the cross country in 1946. After retiring from competitions he was a board member of the Swedish Athletics Association.

References

1923 births
2013 deaths
Swedish male middle-distance runners
Swedish male long-distance runners
Olympic athletes of Sweden
Athletes (track and field) at the 1948 Summer Olympics